Kristie Davis (née Karen Stenglein, later Kristie Marano) (born January 24, 1979) is a wrestler from Albany, New York.

Davis won nine medals at the Women's World Championships in wrestling, two of which were gold.  In 2004, Davis (who was competing as Kristie Marano at the time) received the James M. Cooke Memorial Award as the New York Athletic Club's (NYAC) Athlete of the Year. She was the third woman to receive this award.

In 2002, she was awarded Women's Wrestler of the Year by USA Wrestling.

Kristie married Link Davis, the head coach of the Emmanuel College wrestling team, and went by Kristie Davis in 2016. She is an alumna of Colonie Central High School and Hudson Valley Community College and  Pikes Peak Community College.  She has a daughter named Kayla from her first marriage.

Davis came out of retirement in 2016 in an unsuccessful attempt to make the U.S. Olympic team in the 75 kg class.

References

1979 births
Living people
American female sport wrestlers
Sportspeople from Albany, New York
Wrestlers at the 2007 Pan American Games
Pan American Games medalists in wrestling
Pan American Games gold medalists for the United States
World Wrestling Championships medalists
Medalists at the 2007 Pan American Games
21st-century American women